Night in Jinling is a 1985 Chinese film. It was directed by Qian Jiang, the son of Qian Zhuangfei.

Plot
In 1927, Chiang Kai-shek and the Kuomintang turned against the Communist Party of China and initiated a massacre of the communists. Qian Zhuangfei left his home in Beijing and went to Shanghai. Qian entered the service of Xu Enzeng, a cousin of Chen Lifu. In 1931, Gu Shunzhang, communist security chief, was captured by the Kuomintang and defected, betraying many other communists. Qian manages to warn Zhou Enlai but is himself betrayed by Gu Shunzhang.

Cast
Kong Xiangyu as Qian Zhuangfei
Zhu Decheng as Gu Shunzhang
Wang Tiecheng as Zhou Enlai
Sun Feihu as Chiang Kai-shek
Liu Jian as Chen Lifu
Zhu Mingzi as Zhang Zhenhua, Qian Zhuangfei's wife
Ai Junmai as Xu Enzeng
Qiu Hewei as Li Kenong
Tan Tianxian as Hu Di
Wang Biao as Cai Mengjian

External links
Nights in Nanjing at the Chinese Movie Database

1985 films
Chinese historical films
Chinese drama films
1980s Mandarin-language films
Films set in the 1920s
Films set in the 1930s
Films set in China
Films shot in China
Cultural depictions of Chiang Kai-shek
Cultural depictions of Zhou Enlai